Wilbert Thirkield "Big Chief" Ellis (November 10, 1914 – December 20, 1977) was an American blues pianist and vocalist.

Biography
Ellis was born in Birmingham, Alabama, United States, and was an autodidact at piano. He played at local parties and dances in the late 1920s before leaving Alabama, traveling the United States and working odd jobs. He served in the Army from 1939 to 1942, then moved to New York City, where he accompanied touring blues performers for their concerts in the city. He recorded with Lenox Records in 1945, and recorded for Capitol Records with Sonny Terry and Brownie McGhee in the 1950s.

In 1972, Ellis moved to Washington, D.C., where he operated a liquor store.  Towards the end of his life, Ellis began recording for Trix Records, where he played again with McGhee as well as Tarheel Slim and John Cephas.

Ellis died in Birmingham, Alabama, of heart failure aged 63.

References

External links
[ Big Chief Ellis biography] at AllMusic

1914 births
1977 deaths
American blues pianists
American male pianists
American blues singers
Musicians from Birmingham, Alabama
Blues musicians from Alabama
20th-century American singers
20th-century American pianists
20th-century American male musicians